Megan Cherie Woods (born 4 November 1973) is a New Zealand Labour Party politician who serves as a Cabinet Minister in the Sixth Labour Government and has served as Member of Parliament for Wigram since 2011.

Early life
Woods was born and grew up in Wigram, Christchurch. She attended high school at Catholic Cathedral College. She obtained a master's degree from the University of Canterbury with her thesis being titled Re/producing the nation : women making identity in New Zealand, 1906-1925. She went on to obtain a PhD in history again at the University of Canterbury with a thesis titled Integrating the nation: Gendering Maori urbanisation and integration, 1942–1969.

Professional life
Woods was a business manager for Crop & Food Research (2005–08) and its successor organisation Plant and Food Research (2008), based at Lincoln.

Political career

Woods was a member of the Alliance Party from 1999 until 2002, when she joined the breakaway Progressive Party. She was involved in several of Jim Anderton's re-election campaigns. She contested the Christchurch Central electorate in the 2005 general election and came fourth, receiving 1077 votes (3.2% of the electorate votes). She was placed fourth on the Progressive party list. As the party obtained only 1.2% of the party vote, she did not enter Parliament that year.

She was a member of the Spreydon-Heathcote community board in Christchurch from 2004 to 2007.

Woods joined the Labour Party in 2007. In the same year, she contested the Christchurch mayoralty for the centre-left Christchurch 2021 group, receiving 32,821 votes and coming second against Bob Parker (47,033 votes), but beating Jo Giles (14,454 votes) in the election contested by ten candidates.  She did not contest the 2008 general election or the 2010 mayoral election.

Woods was selected as the Labour candidate for the 2011 election in the Wigram electorate. She succeeded Jim Anderton, who had announced that he would retire either after winning the Christchurch mayoralty (he was unsuccessful) or at the end of the term of the 49th Parliament in November 2011. Woods was a key member of Anderton's campaign committee, along with key Progressive Party members like Jeanette Lawrence and Liz Maunsell, and Labour activists such as campaign manager Tony Milne, Ben Ross and Liana Foster. Until the 2010 Canterbury earthquake, Anderton was leading in the opinion polls, and winning the mayoralty would have caused a by-election in the Wigram electorate. The earthquake resulted in a mood swing in Christchurch, and Anderton lost against Bob Parker. Anderton remained an MP until the end of the term of the 49th Parliament, and Woods won in the 2011 general election in the Wigram electorate.

Member of Parliament

In opposition: 2011–2017
Woods's candidacy, which began in late 2010, was centred on job creation in her electorate. She stated in her Labour selection speech that "Growing up here in the 1980s, I watched people lose their jobs. I saw workplaces like the Addington Workshops shut their doors forever. Now I am 36 years old and am watching jobs disappear from our communities again." Woods also cited the rising cost of living for everyday people as a major concern.

During the 2011 election, Woods won the seat with 45.11% of the vote and a majority of 1,500 votes.

Woods was previously Labour Party's spokesperson for the Environment and Climate Change and has served prior as the Party's spokesperson for Tertiary Education and associate spokesperson for Science and Innovation.

During the 2017 general election, Woods retained Wigram for Labour by a margin of 4,594 votes.

In government: 2017–present
Woods was elected as a Cabinet Minister by the Labour Party caucus following Labour's formation of a coalition government with New Zealand First and the Greens. As of 2017, Woods is the Minister of Energy and Resources. On 12 April, Woods announced that the Government would halt future gas and oil exploration but clarified that the existing 22 contracts would be allowed to continue.

On 27 June 2019, in Prime Minister Jacinda Ardern's first major reshuffle of the coalition government, Woods was appointed Minister of Housing, replacing Phil Twyford.

On 19 June 2020, Woods was given joint responsibility with Air Commodore Darryn Webb for overseeing isolation and quarantine facilities for travellers entering New Zealand, as part of the government's response to the COVID-19 pandemic.

During the 2020 general election, Woods retained her seat of Wigram by a final margin of 14,770 votes. In early November 2020, she retained her ministerial portfolios of Housing, Energy and Resources, and Research, Science and Innovation, while picking up the position of Associate Minister of Finance.

In late February 2021, Woods defended the Government's Progressive Home Ownership Scheme, which had cost NZ$17 million but only resettled 12 families in the last seven months. In response, National's housing spokesperson Nicola Willis described the program as a failure and contended that Woods was out of touch.

References 

|-

|-

|-
 

|-

|-

|-

|-

New Zealand Labour Party MPs
Living people
Jim Anderton's Progressive Party politicians
1973 births
Alliance (New Zealand political party) politicians
Members of the New Zealand House of Representatives
New Zealand MPs for Christchurch electorates
Unsuccessful candidates in the 2005 New Zealand general election
University of Canterbury alumni
21st-century New Zealand politicians
Candidates in the 2017 New Zealand general election
Members of the Cabinet of New Zealand
Women government ministers of New Zealand
People educated at Catholic Cathedral College
Candidates in the 2020 New Zealand general election